Klaus Alarik Castrén (13 April 1923, Suomenlinna – 17 January 2011, Helsinki) was a Finnish diplomat, a Master of Political Science by education. He was the Finnish Ambassador to Mexico City from 1970 to 1972, Head of Department Department of the Department of Foreign Affairs from 1972 to 1976, Ambassador to Buenos Aires from 1976 to 1983 and to Ankara from 1983 to 1986.

During his tenure in Argentina Castrén forbade and attempted to hinder any assistance to the victims of the military junta after the 1976 coup d'état, which in part led to the disappearance and death of at least one Finnish citizen, Hanna Hietala, and her family.

References

Ambassadors of Finland to Mexico
Ambassadors of Finland to Argentina
Ambassadors of Finland to Turkey
Diplomats from Helsinki
Finnish genealogists
1923 births
2011 deaths